United Nations Security Council resolution 677, adopted unanimously on 28 November 1990, after recalling resolutions 660 (1990), 662 (1990) and 674 (1990), the Council condemned attempts by Iraq to alter the demographic information of Kuwait and the restrictions on the movement of its citizens.

Acting under Chapter VII of the United Nations Charter, the Council also condemned attempts by Iraq to destroy civil records maintained by the Government of Kuwait. Therefore, the resolution mandated the Secretary-General Javier Pérez de Cuéllar to take custody of a population register of Kuwait that has been certified by the "legitimate Government of Kuwait" and which covers the population register until 1 August 1990. It also asked the Secretary-General and the Kuwaiti government to establish a set of rules and regulations governing access to the register.

The resolution was adopted in anticipation of the disappearance of Kuwaitis or the influx of non-Kuwaitis as a result of Iraqi policy in the occupied country.

See also
 Foreign relations of Iraq
 Gulf War
 Invasion of Kuwait
 Iraq–Kuwait relations
 List of United Nations Security Council Resolutions 601 to 700 (1987–1991)

References

External links
 
Text of the Resolution at undocs.org
Text of the resolution at un.org, German translation

 0677
 0677
Gulf War
1990 in Iraq
1990 in Kuwait
 0677
November 1990 events